Jimmy Julien Briand (born 2 August 1985) is a French professional footballer. He started his career as a striker, but is now usually deployed on the wing.

Briand is a graduate of Clairefontaine academy and was a France youth international. He made five appearances for the France senior team from 2008 to 2012, making his debut on 11 October 2008 against Romania.

Club career

Rennes

Born in Vitry-sur-Seine, Val-de-Marne, Briand began his career at Ivry, before joining CSF Brétigny. Thereafter, he was selected to attend the INF Clairefontaine. After finishing his stint at the INF Clairefontaine, Briand joined the youth academy of Ligue 1 club Rennes.

While in Rennes' youth system, Briand won the Coupe Gambardella in 2003. He made his first team debut on 20 May 2003 during the 2002–03 Ligue 1 season, at the age of 17, in a Ligue 1 match against Paris Saint-Germain, coming on as a substitute and playing 25 minutes. The match finished 0–0. Over the next two seasons, his play was limited to appearing in only 17 Ligue 1 matches and scoring just one Ligue 1 goal (his first ever), against Montpellier in a 4–0 victory.

Briand finally broke into the first team for the 2005–06 season, appearing in 29 Ligue 1 matches and scoring three Ligue 1 goals to help Rennes finish in 7th position in the 2005-06 Ligue 1; they just missed qualifying for the 2006 UEFA Intertoto Cup by one spot. Over the next two years, he appeared in all but four of the club's Ligue 1 matches, due to his consistently good performances in competitive matches and his not sustaining injuries. Despite being linked to clubs outside France, Briand decided to stay with Rennes for the 2008–09 season, during which he scored a club-high eight Ligue 1 goals. On 26 March 2009, Briand ruptured his anterior cruciate ligament in his left knee, while training with the France national team. The injury required six months to heal. As a result, Briand only made his 2009–10 Ligue 1 season debut for Rennes on 29 October, in a Ligue 1 match against Monaco. He finished the 2009–10 season with 23 appearances, scoring five goals.

Lyon
On 14 June 2010, Lyon president and chairman Jean-Michel Aulas announced that the club had signed Briand to a four-year contract effective on 1 July. The transfer fee was priced at €7.4 million. On 7 August 2010, he made his competitive debut for the club in a 0–0 home draw against Monaco, playing every minute of the match. On 18 February 2011, Briand scored an overhead bicycle kick goal in a 4–0 home win over Nancy.

Hannover 96
Bundesliga club Hannover 96 confirmed the signing of Briand on 22 August 2014.

Guingamp
On 3 August 2015, Briand joined Guingamp on a two-year contract. On 17 May 2017, Briand extended his contract by two years, keeping him with the club until 30 June 2019.

On 11 May 2018, Briand scored a goal from the penalty spot, his fifth goal in his last six Ligue 1 matches, in the 3–3 Ligue 1 home draw against Olympique de Marseille; it was also his 30th career Ligue 1 goal for Guingamp since joining them in August 2015.

Bordeaux
On 10 August 2018, Briand joined Guingamp's Ligue 1 rivals, Bordeaux, on a two-year contract. He was released by Guingamp just three weeks before joining Bordeaux, with one year left on his contract with Guingamp. He had a "moral agreement" that he would not join another Ligue 1 club. Briand had secured a tentative deal to join Major League Soccer club Montreal Impact, but it fell through on 26 July 2018.

On 31 August 2019, Briand scored the equalizer for Bordeaux, in an 1–1 away draw against Lyon, to become only the second player to score in 15 different Ligue 1 seasons in the 21st century, following in the footsteps of Souleymane Camara. On 25 October 2020, Briand scored his 100th Ligue 1 goal in a 2–0 win over Nîmes. In June 2022, he confirmed his departure from Bordeaux.

International career
Briand played for the under-21 team from 2004 to 2006, scoring 9 goals in 25 appearances. He was a member of the French squad that participated in the 2006 UEFA European Under-21 Championship helping France reach the semi-finals before losing to the Netherlands.

Briand received his first call-up to the senior side in May 2007 for France's Euro 2008 qualification matches against Ukraine and Georgia. He would not make his debut in those matches. On 11 October 2008, Briand made his international debut, coming on as a substitute for Franck Ribéry in the 90th minute, against Romania, in a 2010 World Cup away qualifying match that ended in a 2–2 draw.

Career statistics

Club

Honours
Lyon
Coupe de France: 2011–12
Trophée des Champions: 2012

References

External links

1985 births
Living people
People from Vitry-sur-Seine
Footballers from Val-de-Marne
French footballers
France youth international footballers
France under-21 international footballers
France international footballers
Association football forwards
US Ivry players
INF Clairefontaine players
Stade Rennais F.C. players
Olympique Lyonnais players
Hannover 96 players
En Avant Guingamp players
FC Girondins de Bordeaux players
Ligue 1 players
Bundesliga players
French expatriate footballers
Expatriate footballers in Germany
French expatriate sportspeople in Germany
French people of Guadeloupean descent
French people of Martiniquais descent